Kevin William Cairns (29 June 1937 – 11 September 2017) was an English footballer who played as a left back in the Scottish Football League for Dundee United and in the Football League for Southport, where he spent most of his career.

Playing career
Cairns was briefly attached to Blackburn Rovers as a youngster, and also played non-League football for Weymouth and Carshalton Athletic. During his National Service, he played in an Army match alongside Dundee United's Ron Yeats, who recommended him to the club. Cairns signed for Dundee United in September 1960, making his debut that month in a Scottish Football League match against St Johnstone. After being a first team regular in his first season, Cairns made only one appearance in 1961–62 and was given a free transfer by Dundee United in May 1962. He signed for Southport in August 1962, going on to make 206 appearances in the Football League over the next six years. He then played non-league football for Wigan Athletic, where he played four games in the Cheshire League, and made a further five appearances in the Northern Premier League.

References

External links
 
 

1937 births
2017 deaths
Footballers from Preston, Lancashire
English footballers
Association football fullbacks
Preston North End F.C. players
Dundee United F.C. players
Southport F.C. players
Wigan Athletic F.C. players
Scottish Football League players
English Football League players